GNB may refer to:

 Alpes–Isère Airport, near Grenoble, France
 G. N. Balasubramaniam, Indian singer
 Geographical Names Board of Canada
 Geographical Names Board of New South Wales
 Good News Bible
 Gaussian naive Bayes
 Venezuelan National Guard
 GNB, a fictional television network on the American TV show Less Than Perfect
 Guinea-Bissau, ISO 3166-1 alpha-3
 Goliath National Bank, a fictional bank in the American TV sitcom How I Met Your Mother
 Next generation NodeB, or gNodeB, the 5G NR in 5G networks.

See also